The Keta River is a river in Southeastern Alaska in the United States, flowing generally south-southwest to enter the Boca de Quadra, which connects to the sea via Revillagigedo Channel about  east of Ketchikan. It is located almost entirely within Misty Fjords National Monument.

References

Rivers of Alaska
Rivers of the Boundary Ranges
Rivers of Ketchikan Gateway Borough, Alaska
Rivers of Prince of Wales–Hyder Census Area, Alaska
Rivers of Unorganized Borough, Alaska